Testa Grigia (French : Tête grise, lit. "grey head") (3,315m) is a mountain on the Italian side of the Monte Rosa Massif in the Pennine Alps. It is the highest mountain of the ridge that separates the Lys valley (Gressoney-La-Trinité) from the Ayas Valley, in Aosta Valley.

Ascent 
It is usually climbed from the Gressoney side, where the climb presents no technical difficulties, as the route is assisted by a fixed rope. The summit offers a fine balcony view of Monte Rosa and the Matterhorn.

References

Mountains of the Alps
Alpine three-thousanders
Mountains of Aosta Valley
Pennine Alps